Amara castanea is a species of beetle of the genus Amara in the family Carabidae.

References

carinata
Beetles described in 1866